Bear Mountain is a summit in the U.S. state of Nevada.

Bear Mountain was named for the bears which roamed there.

References

Mountains of Elko County, Nevada